Dong District (Dong-gu) is a district in Daejeon, a metropolitan city in South Korea.

See also
Samseong-dong

External links
Dong-gu website